A grape is a fruit, botanically a berry, of the deciduous woody vines of the flowering plant genus Vitis. Grapes are a non-climacteric type of fruit, generally occurring in clusters.

The cultivation of grapes began perhaps 8,000 years ago, and the fruit has been used as human food over history. Eaten fresh or in dried form (as raisins, currants and sultanas), grapes also hold cultural significance in many parts of the world, particularly for their role in winemaking. Other grape-derived products include various types of jam, juice, vinegar and oil.

History 
The Middle East is generally described as the homeland of grapes and the cultivation of this plant began there 6,000–8,000 years ago. Yeast, one of the earliest domesticated microorganisms, occurs naturally on the skins of grapes, leading to the discovery of alcoholic drinks such as wine. The earliest archeological evidence for a dominant position of wine-making in human culture dates from 8,000 years ago in Georgia.

The oldest known winery was found in Armenia, dating to around 4000 BC. By the 9th century AD, the city of Shiraz was known to produce some of the finest wines in the Middle East. Thus it has been proposed that Syrah red wine is named after Shiraz, a city in Persia where the grape was used to make Shirazi wine.

Ancient Egyptian hieroglyphics record the cultivation of purple grapes, and history attests to the ancient Greeks,  Cypriots, Phoenicians, and Romans growing purple grapes both for eating and wine production. The growing of grapes would later spread to other regions in Europe, as well as North Africa, and eventually in North America.

In 2005 a team of archaeologists concluded that some Chalcolithic wine jars, which were discovered in Cyprus in the 1930s, were the oldest of their kind in the world, dating back to 3,500 BC. Moreover, Commandaria, a sweet dessert wine from Cyprus, is the oldest manufactured wine in the world, its origins traced as far back as 2000 BC. 

In North America, native grapes belonging to various species of the genus Vitis proliferate in the wild across the continent, and were a part of the diet of many Native Americans, but were considered by early European colonists to be unsuitable for wine. In the 19th century, Ephraim Bull of Concord, Massachusetts, cultivated seeds from wild Vitis labrusca vines to create the Concord grape which would become an important agricultural crop in the United States.

Description 
Grapes are a type of fruit that grow in clusters of 15 to 300, and can be crimson, black, dark blue, yellow, green, orange, and pink. "White" grapes are actually green in color, and are evolutionarily derived from the purple grape. Mutations in two regulatory genes of white grapes turn off production of anthocyanins, which are responsible for the color of purple grapes. Anthocyanins and other pigment chemicals of the larger family of polyphenols in purple grapes are responsible for the varying shades of purple in red wines. Grapes are typically an ellipsoid shape resembling a prolate spheroid.

Nutrition
Raw grapes are 81% water, 18% carbohydrates, 1% protein, and have negligible fat (table). A  reference amount of raw grapes supplies  of food energy and a moderate amount of vitamin K (14% of the Daily Value), with no other micronutrients in significant content.

Grapevines 

Most domesticated grapes come from cultivars of Vitis vinifera, a grapevine native to the Mediterranean and Central Asia. Minor amounts of fruit and wine come from American and Asian species such as:

 Vitis amurensis, the most important Asian species
 Vitis labrusca, the North American table and grape juice grapevines (including the Concord cultivar), sometimes used for wine, are native to the Eastern United States and Canada.
 Vitis mustangensis (the mustang grape), found in Mississippi, Alabama, Louisiana, Texas, and Oklahoma
 Vitis riparia, a wild vine of North America, is sometimes used for winemaking and for jam. It is native to the entire Eastern United States and north to Quebec.
 Vitis rotundifolia (the muscadine), used for jams and wine, is native to the Southeastern United States from Delaware to the Gulf of Mexico.

Trade

Distribution and production 

According to the Food and Agriculture Organization (FAO), 75,866 square kilometers of the world are dedicated to grapes. Approximately 71% of world grape production is used for wine, 27% as fresh fruit, and 2% as dried fruit. A portion of grape production goes to producing grape juice to be reconstituted for fruits canned "with no added sugar" and "100% natural". The area dedicated to vineyards is increasing by about 2% per year.

There are no reliable statistics that break down grape production by variety. It is believed that the most widely planted variety is Sultana, also known as Thompson Seedless, with at least 3,600 km2 (880,000 acres) dedicated to it. The second most common variety is Airén. Other popular varieties include Cabernet Sauvignon, Sauvignon blanc, Cabernet Franc, Merlot, Grenache, Tempranillo, Riesling, and Chardonnay.

Table and wine grapes 

Commercially cultivated grapes can usually be classified as either table or wine grapes, based on their intended method of consumption: eaten raw (table grapes) or used to make wine (wine grapes). While almost all of them belong to the same species, Vitis vinifera, table and wine grapes have significant differences, brought about through selective breeding. Table grape cultivars tend to have large, seedless fruit (see below) with relatively thin skin. Wine grapes are smaller, usually seeded, and have relatively thick skins (a desirable characteristic in winemaking, since much of the aroma in wine comes from the skin). Wine grapes also tend to be very sweet: they are harvested at the time when their juice is approximately 24% sugar by weight. By comparison, commercially produced "100% grape juice", made from table grapes, is usually around 15% sugar by weight.

Seedless grapes 
Seedless cultivars now make up the overwhelming majority of table grape plantings. Because grapevines are vegetatively propagated by cuttings, the lack of seeds does not present a problem for reproduction. It is an issue for breeders, who must either use a seeded variety as the female parent or rescue embryos early in development using tissue culture techniques.

There are several sources of the seedlessness trait, and essentially all commercial cultivators get it from one of three sources: Thompson Seedless, Russian Seedless, and Black Monukka, all being cultivars of Vitis vinifera. There are currently more than a dozen varieties of seedless grapes. Several, such as Einset Seedless, Benjamin Gunnels's Prime seedless grapes, Reliance, and Venus, have been specifically cultivated for hardiness and quality in the relatively cold climates of northeastern United States and southern Ontario.

An offset to the improved eating quality of seedlessness is the loss of potential health benefits provided by the enriched phytochemical content of grape seeds (see Health claims, below).

Raisins, currants and sultanas 

In most of Europe and North America, dried grapes are referred to as "raisins" or the local equivalent. In the UK, three different varieties are recognized, forcing the EU to use the term "dried vine fruit" in official documents.

A raisin is any dried grape. While raisin is a French loanword, the word in French refers to the fresh fruit; grappe (from which the English grape is derived) refers to the bunch (as in une grappe de raisins). A raisin in French is called raisin sec ("dry grape").

A currant is a dried Zante Black Corinth grape, the name being a corruption of the French raisin de Corinthe (Corinth grape). The names of the black and red currant, now more usually blackcurrant and redcurrant, two berries unrelated to grapes, are derived from this use. Some other fruits of similar appearance are also so named, for example, Australian currant, native currant, Indian currant.

A sultana was originally a raisin made from Sultana grapes of Turkish origin (known as Thompson Seedless in the United States), but the word is now applied to raisins made from either white grapes or red grapes that are bleached to resemble the traditional sultana.

Juice 

Grape juice is obtained from crushing and blending grapes into a liquid. The juice is often sold in stores or fermented and made into wine, brandy, or vinegar.  Grape juice that has been pasteurized, removing any naturally occurring yeast, will not ferment if kept sterile, and thus contains no alcohol.  In the wine industry, grape juice that contains 7–23% of pulp, skins, stems and seeds is often referred to as "must". In North America, the most common grape juice is purple and made from Concord grapes, while white grape juice is commonly made from Niagara grapes, both of which are varieties of  grapes, a different species from European wine grapes. In California, Sultana (known there as Thompson Seedless) grapes are sometimes diverted from the raisin or table market to produce white juice.

Pomace and phytochemicals
Winemaking from red and white grape flesh and skins produces substantial quantities of organic residues, collectively called pomace (also "marc"), which includes crushed skins, seeds, stems, and leaves generally used as compost. Grape pomace – some 10-30% of the total mass of grapes crushed – contains various phytochemicals, such as unfermented sugars, alcohol, polyphenols, tannins, anthocyanins, and numerous other compounds, some of which are harvested and extracted for commercial applications (a process sometimes called "valorization" of the pomace).

Skin 

Anthocyanins tend to be the main polyphenolics in purple grapes, whereas flavan-3-ols (i.e. catechins) are the more abundant class of polyphenols in white varieties. Total phenolic content is higher in purple varieties due almost entirely to anthocyanin density in purple grape skin compared to absence of anthocyanins in white grape skin. Phenolic content of grape skin varies with cultivar, soil composition, climate, geographic origin, and cultivation practices or exposure to diseases, such as fungal infections.

Muscadine grapes contain a relatively high phenolic content among dark grapes. In muscadine skins, ellagic acid, myricetin, quercetin, kaempferol, and trans-resveratrol are major phenolics.

The flavonols syringetin, syringetin 3-O-galactoside, laricitrin and laricitrin 3-O-galactoside are also found in purple grape but absent in white grape.

Seeds 

Muscadine grape seeds contain about twice the total polyphenol content of skins. Grape seed oil from crushed seeds is used in cosmeceuticals and skincare products. Grape seed oil, including tocopherols (vitamin E) and high contents of phytosterols and polyunsaturated fatty acids such as linoleic acid, oleic acid, and alpha-linolenic acid.

Resveratrol 

Resveratrol, a stilbene compound, is found in widely varying amounts among grape varieties, primarily in their skins and seeds. Muscadine grapes have about one hundred times higher concentration of stilbenes than pulp. Fresh grape skin contains about 50 to 100 micrograms of resveratrol per gram.

Health claims

French paradox 

Comparing diets among Western countries, researchers have discovered that although French people tend to eat higher levels of animal fat, the incidence of heart disease remains low in France. This phenomenon has been termed the French paradox, and is thought to occur from protective benefits of regularly consuming red wine, among other dietary practices. Alcohol consumption in moderation may be cardioprotective by its minor anticoagulant effect and vasodilation.

Although adoption of wine consumption is generally not recommended by health authorities, some research indicates moderate consumption, such as one glass of red wine a day for women and two for men, may confer health benefits. Alcohol itself may have protective effects on the cardiovascular system.

Grape and raisin toxicity in dogs 

The consumption of grapes and raisins presents a potential health threat to dogs. Their toxicity to dogs can cause the animal to develop acute kidney failure (the sudden development of kidney failure) with anuria (a lack of urine production) and may be fatal.

In religion 

Christians have traditionally used wine during worship services as a means of remembering the blood of Jesus Christ which was shed for the remission of sins. Christians who oppose the partaking of alcoholic beverages sometimes use grape juice as the "cup" or "wine" in the Lord's Supper.

The Catholic Church continues to use wine in the celebration of the Eucharist because it is part of the tradition passed down through the ages starting with Jesus Christ at the Last Supper, where Catholics believe the consecrated bread and wine become the body and blood of Jesus Christ, a dogma known as transubstantiation. Wine is used (not grape juice) both due to its strong Scriptural roots, and also to follow the tradition set by the early Christian Church. The Code of Canon Law of the Catholic Church (1983), Canon 924 says that the wine used must be natural, made from grapes of the vine, and not corrupt.

Gallery

See also 

 Annual growth cycle of grapevines
 Drakshasava, a traditional Ayurvedic tonic made from grapes
 Grape syrup
 List of grape dishes
 List of grape varieties
 Menispermum canadense, a poisonous species resembling wild grapes
 Propagation of grapevines
 The Fox and the Grapes

References

Further reading 
 Creasy, G. L. and L. L. Creasy (2009). Grapes (Crop Production Science in Horticulture). CABI. .

External links 

 
 

 
Berries
Crops originating from Europe
Edible fruits
Plants in the Bible
Flora of Palestine (region)
Flora of Israel